Luca Chierico (born 26 September 2001) is an Italian professional footballer who plays as a midfielder for  club Piacenza, on loan from Genoa.

Club career
Born in Rome, Chierico started his career in local club Roma youth sector.

On 26 January 2021, he signed with  Genoa.

On 1 February 2021, he was loaned to Serie B club . Chierico made his Serie B debut on 10 May 2021 against Frosione as a late substitute.

For the 2021–22 season, he was loaned to Serie C club Olbia.

On 31 August 2022, Chierico moved on a new loan to Foggia. On 5 January 2023, he was loaned to Piacenza.

International career
On 11 October 2019 Chierico played a match for Italy U19 against Portugal U19.

Personal life
His father Odoacre was also a footballer.

References

External links
 

2001 births
Living people
Footballers from Rome
Italian footballers
Italy youth international footballers
Association football midfielders
Serie B players
Serie C players
A.S. Roma players
Genoa C.F.C. players
Reggina 1914 players
Olbia Calcio 1905 players
Calcio Foggia 1920 players
Piacenza Calcio 1919 players